Abdallah ibn al-Mu'tazz (861 – 17 December 908) was the son of the caliph al-Mu'tazz and a political figure, but is better known as a leading Arabic poet and the author of the Kitab al-Badi, an early study of Arabic forms of poetry. This work is considered one of the earliest works in Arabic literary theory and literary criticism. 

Persuaded to assume the role of caliph of the Abbasid dynasty following the premature death of al-Muktafi, he succeeded in ruling for a single day and a single night, before he was forced into hiding, found and then strangled in a palace intrigue that brought al-Muqtadir, then thirteen years old, to the throne.

Life

Born in Samarra as a prince of the imperial house and the great-great-grandson of Harun al-Rashid, Ibn al-Mu'tazz had a tragic childhood in the Byzantine intrigues of the Abbasid caliphate. His grandfather, the caliph al-Mutawakkil, was assassinated when Ibn al-Mu'tazz was only six weeks old. These events ushered in the nine-year Anarchy at Samarra. Abdallah ibn al-Mu'tazz's father, al-Mu'tazz 13th Caliph of the Abbasid Caliphate, came to power in 866, but in 869 was also murdered. The boy was spared the purge of the palace by fleeing to Mecca with his grandmother Qabiha.

Upon returning to Baghdad soon after, he distanced himself from politics and lived the hedonistic life of a young prince. It was during this time that he wrote his poetry, devoted to the pleasures with which he was so familiar.

After reigning from 5 April 902 to 13 August 908, the 17th Caliph, Abdallah ibn al-Mu'tazz's cousin Al-Muktafi, died. Vizier al-Abbas ibn al-Hasan al-Jarjara'i wished to install Al-Muktafi's thirteen-year-old brother Al-Muqtadir on the throne, clearly intending to be the power behind the throne himself. Despite his reluctance, Ibn al-Mu'tazz was persuaded by the opposition to assume the caliphate instead, in the hope that he would put an end to the intrigues that had plagued the dynasty for decades. He was crowned on 17 December 908, but was overthrown the same day. He fled the palace in Baghdad and hid with a friend, but was found on 29 December and strangled. Almost prophetically, he had once written as a poet:

A wonderful night, but so short
I brought it to life, then strangled it.

And another:

Accordingly, Abdallah ibn al-Mu'tazz was succeeded by the young Al-Muqtadir, who is accounted the 18th Caliph of the Abbasid Caliphate.

Works

Al-Mu'tazz's Kitab al-Badi, composed in 888 when he was 27, laid the groundwork for future studies of poetry by Arabic scholars. Its title can be translated as 'the book of the new style', and 'takes its name from its polemical aim, namely to show that the style of the poets called "modern" (muḥdathūn), such as Bashshār b. Burd (d. 167 or 168/784-5), Muslim b. al-Walīd (d. 208/823), or Abū Nuwās (d. between 198/813 and 200/815), is not so very "new" and that none of its features was not anticipated in the Quran, the traditions of Muḥammad and his companions, and old poetry.'

In the estimation of Charles Greville Tuety:

Ibn Al-Mu‘tazz is the spontaneous poet, akin in temper to Abu Nuwās. Free-ranging in his choice of subject, he is noted for newness of approach in handling his themes. What makes him essentially new, however, lies on another plane and is not immediately apparent: Carried along by his bold and sensuous imagery, we are satisfied that it is so, until, on pausing, we suddenly glimpse the perspective beyond.

Editions
There are two main editions of Al-Mu‘tazz's dīwān: Muhammad Badī‘ Šarīf (ed.), Dīwān aš‘ār al-amīr Abī l-‘Abbās ‘Abdallāh b. Muḥammad al-Mu‘tazz, Dahā’ir al-‘Arab (Cairo: Dār al-Ma‘ārif, 1977-78) and Yūnus Ahmad as-Sāmarrā’ī (ed.), Ši‘r Ibn al-Mu‘tazz: Qism 1: ad-Dīwān'; Qism 2: ad-Dirāsa, two parts in four volumes (Baghdad: Wizārat al-I‘lām, al-Ǧumhūrīya al-‘Irāqīa [Iraqi Ministry of Information], 1978). Of the two, the latter is more reliable, but at times the former offers better readings.

See also
 Al-Mufawwid

References

Further reading
 'Abd Allah ibn al-Mu'tazz, Kitāb al-Badī‘, ed. by Ignatius Kratchkovsky, Gibb Memorial New Series, 10 (London, 1935).
 G.B.H. Wightman and A.Y. al-Udhari, Birds through a Ceiling of Alabaster: Three Abbasid Poets, Penguin Books, 1975.
 Charles Greville Tuety (trans.), Classical Arabic Poetry: 162 Poems from Imrulkais to Ma‘arri (London: KPI, 1985), pp. 247–63.

861 births
908 deaths
9th-century Arabs
10th-century Arabs
10th-century Abbasid caliphs
9th-century Arabic poets
10th-century Arabic poets
People from Samarra
Poets from the Abbasid Caliphate
Baghdad under the Abbasid Caliphate
Sons of Abbasid caliphs